Ryan Petersen is a Grammy winning producer/songwriter/multi-instrumentalist who works out of both Los Angeles and Nashville. Some of the artists he has collaborated with include Switchfoot, Simple Plan, Matt Stell and Leighton Meester. He produced music for the hit NBC/Universal show Parenthood and appeared in 7 episodes. He is currently producing and writing music for the hit CW TV show Riverdale.

Selected Discography

References 
 Ryan Petersen Credits AllMusic
 Ryan Petersen Credits AllMusic
 Past Winners Search GRAMMY.com

Living people
Year of birth missing (living people)